Enfield Town Football Club is a football club based in Enfield, Greater London, England. The club badge features the Enfield beast.

History
The club was founded on 23 June 2001 by the Enfield Supporters' Trust after Trust members considered that the regime in charge of Enfield no longer had the interests of the club at heart and lacked sufficient will to bring about the return of the club to its home town, having left Southbury Road in 1999. This followed the chairman of Enfield withdrawing from an outline agreement with the Supporters' Trust which would have seen the Trust take over the running of a debt-free club and receiving £100,000 from money from the sale of Southbury Road which was held in an escrow account by Enfield Council. The balance of over £600,000 would have been paid to the chairman.

The newly formed club were admitted to the Essex Senior League for the 2001–02 season, three divisions below the Isthmian League Premier Division where Enfield continued to play. The club's first season saw them finish second in the league and win the League Cup, the Capital Counties Feeder Leagues Trophy, and the Middlesex Senior Charity Cup. The following season they won the Essex Senior League, but were not promoted due to ground grading issues. Despite only finishing fourth in the 2003–04 season, in May 2004 the Isthmian League invited the club to join Division Two, but later rescinded the offer. They won the Essex Senior League for a second time in 2004–05, and were promoted to Division One East of the Southern League, which Enfield were also members of. They finished third in their first season in the Southern League, qualifying for the play-offs, where they were beaten 3–1 after extra time in the semi-finals by Wivenhoe Town.

In the summer of 2006 the club were transferred to Division One North of the Isthmian League. The 2006–07 season saw them finish third again, but they lost 4–2 to AFC Sudbury in the play-off semi-finals. At the end of the season Enfield were liquidated and Enfield Town chairman Paul Millington released a statement suggesting that the two clubs should merge and "return the name of Enfield to the top of the non-league world". However, the Enfield players, officials and supporters rejected the offer and formed a brand new club named Enfield 1893. Enfield Town qualified for the play-offs again in 2009–10 after finishing fourth. However, after beating Wingate & Finchley 3–2 in the semi-finals, they lost 3–1 in the final to Concord Rangers. In 2011–12 they were runners-up in the division and went on to win the play-offs with a 1–0 win over Needham Market in the final, earning promotion to the Premier Division.

At the start of the 2012–13 season the club won the Supporters Direct Cup, defeating Wrexham 3–1. They retained it the following season, beating YB SK Beveren of Belgium 8–2. In 2016–17 they finished fourth in the Isthmian League Premier Division before losing 4–2 to Dulwich Hamlet in the play-off semi-finals. The 2018–19 season saw the club win the Isthmian League's League Cup, beating AFC Hornchurch 2–0 in the final.

Ground

The club originally played at Brimsdown Rovers' Goldsdown Road ground, and were later joined by Enfield 1893. In October 2008, Enfield Council announced a deal with the club allowing the club to relocate to the Queen Elizabeth Stadium, close to Enfield's old Southbury Road ground. At the end of the 2009–10 season the club was awarded a grant of £81,504 by the Football Stadium Improvement Fund towards the first phase of works on the new ground.

They left Goldsdown Road at the end of the 2010–11 season, taking with them much of the ground's infrastructure, which resulted in Enfield 1893, who had won the Essex Senior League, not being able to take promotion to the Isthmian League as the ground no longer met the league's standards. After spending the first few months of the 2011–12 season groundsharing at the Cheshunt Stadium in Cheshunt, they moved into the Queen Elizabeth II Stadium in November 2011, with the first match being a victory against Harefield United in the Middlesex Senior Cup on 9 November. The ground was officially opened with a friendly match against Tottenham Hotspur on 16 November, a game which saw the club's record attendance of 969.

Club officials

Managerial history

Other teams

Reserves
The club set up a reserve side in time for the 2006–07 season and joined the Eastern Division of the Capital League. The club's U21 team play in the Isthmian League's U21 North Division.

Women's team

The club also have a women's team, who play in the FA Women's National League.

Honours
Isthmian League
League Cup winners 2018–19
Essex Senior League
Champions 2002–03, 2004–05
League Cup winners 2001–02, 2003–04
Cherry Red Books Trophy
Winners 2001–02
Middlesex Charity Cup
Winners 2001–02, 2007–08
Supporters Direct Cup
 Winners 2006–07 (joint), 2011–12, 2012–13
George Ruffell Memorial Shield
Winners 2009–10

Records
Best FA Cup performance: Fourth qualifying round, 2015–16
Best FA Trophy performance: Third qualifying round, 2012–13
Best FA Vase performance: Third round, 2003–04, 2004–05
Record attendance: 969 vs Tottenham Hotspur, friendly match, November 2011
Biggest victory: 7–0 vs Ilford, 29 April 2003
Most appearances: Rudi Hall 
Most goals: Liam Hope, 108 (2009–2015)

See also
Enfield Town F.C. players
List of fan-owned sports teams

References

External links
Official website

Football clubs in England
Football clubs in London
Enfield, London
Association football clubs established in 2001
2001 establishments in England
Sport in the London Borough of Enfield
Fan-owned football clubs in England
Essex Senior Football League
Southern Football League clubs
Isthmian League